Georg Theodor Policron Chiewitz (5 October 1815 – 28 December 1862) was a Swedish architect and engineer. Due to financial problems he moved to Finland in 1851, where Chiewitz spent the rest of his career.

Career 
Chiewitz graduated from the Royal Institute of Technology in 1829 and later from the Royal Swedish Academy of Arts. From 1837–1838 he worked as an assistant for inventor John Ericsson in London and in 1839 for architect César Daly in Paris. In 1840, Chiewitz returned to Stockholm having businesses on railroad and bridge construction. In 1851 he went bankrupt and moved to Finland. From 1852–1860, Chiewitz was the regional architect of Turku and Pori Province and 1860–1862 the city architect of Turku.

Works 
Chiewitz was the favourite architect of King Oscar I of Sweden. He designed several structures for Haga Park and the gardens of Ulriksdal Palace in Solna and Tullgarn Palace in Södertälje. Most important works are the Blackamoor Bridge in Ulriksdal Palace and Oscar I's Orangery in the garden of Tullgarn Palace.

His best known works in Finland are the Central Pori Church, House of Nobility (Ritarihuone) and the Swedish Theatre of Helsinki. Chiewitz was also known of his city planning. His most significant work is the Pori city plan as the town was rebuilt after the great fire of 1852. The town of Mariehamn in Åland was established in 1861 by Chiewitz's planning.

Famous works

Sweden 
Blackamoor Bridge, Solna (1845)
Folckerska huset, Stockholm (1848)
Jernbron, Uppsala (1848)
Old Djurgårdsbron, Stockholm (1849)
Oscar I's Orangery, Södertälje (1854)

Finland 
Pori city plan (1852)
Mariehamn city plan (1855)
Uusikaupunki city plan (1856)
Park of the St. Henry's Chapel, Kokemäki (1857)
Central Pori Church (1859–1863)
Swedish Theatre, Helsinki (1860)
Ritarihuone, Helsinki (1862)
Loviisa Church, Loviisa (1862–1865)

Gallery

References

External links 

1815 births
1862 deaths
Businesspeople from Stockholm
Swedish engineers
Swedish emigrants to Finland
Finnish architects
Swedish urban planners
KTH Royal Institute of Technology alumni
19th-century Swedish architects
19th-century Swedish engineers
19th-century Swedish businesspeople